Tremors is a Guatemalan-French drama film, directed by Jayro Bustamante and released in 2019. The film stars Juan Pablo Olyslager as Pablo, a religious man who is coping with the aftermath of having come out as gay after having spent many years married to a woman and fathering children.

The film premiered in the Panorama program at the 69th Berlin International Film Festival. It was subsequently screened at the 2019 San Sebastián International Film Festival, where it won the Sebastiane Latino Award for best Latin American LGBTQ-themed film.

Background actors: Gerson Estrada (Cassandra) and Carmelita Guerra.

References

External links

2019 films
2019 drama films
2019 LGBT-related films
Guatemalan drama films
French drama films
French LGBT-related films
LGBT-related drama films
Gay-related films
Films about conversion therapy
Films directed by Jayro Bustamante
2010s French films